Bolaang Mongondow Selatan Football Club (simply known as Bolsel FC) is an Indonesian football club based in South Bolaang Mongondow Regency, North Sulawesi. They currently compete in the Liga 3.

References

External links

Football clubs in Indonesia
Football clubs in North Sulawesi